Rakovo is a village and municipality in Martin District in the Žilina Region of northern Slovakia.

History
In historical records, the village was first mentioned in 1230.

Geography
The municipality lies at an altitude of 429 metres and covers an area of 5.415 km². It has a population of about 317 people.

References

External links
 
 http://www.statistics.sk/mosmis/eng/run.html

Villages and municipalities in Martin District